Glódís Perla Viggósdóttir (born 27 June 1995) is an Icelandic footballer who plays as a defender for FC Bayern Munich in the Frauen-Bundesliga and the Icelandic national team.

Club career
Glódís Perla played youth football in Denmark with Egebjerg EIF. Her first senior club was HK/Víkingur. She then moved to play for Stjarnan for the 2012 season, after spending three months playing in Denmark with Horsens SIK. She played in the Damallsvenskan for Eskilstuna United from 2015-2017 before moving to FC Rosengård in July 2017.

In July 2021, Glódís Perla signed with FC Bayern Munich of the Frauen-Bundesliga.

International career
On 4 August 2012 Glódís Perla made her senior national team debut in Iceland's 1–1 friendly draw with Scotland at Cappielow.

She was called up to be part of the national team for the UEFA Women's Euro 2013. On 7 April 2022, she played her 100th match for Iceland in a 5–0 win over Belarus in the 2023 FIFA Women's World Cup qualification.

International goals

Honours

Club
Stjarnan
 Icelandic Women's Cup: 2012
 Icelandic Women's Football League Cup: 2013
 Icelandic Women's Super Cup: 2012

FC Rosengård
 Damallsvenskan: 2019
 Svenska Cupen: 2017, 2018

Individual
 Icelandic Women's Footballer of the Year: 2022

References

External links
 
 
 
 
 

1995 births
Living people
Glodis Perla Viggosdottir
Glodis Perla Viggosdottir
Expatriate women's footballers in Denmark
Glodis Perla Viggosdottir
Glodis Perla Viggosdottir
Eskilstuna United DFF players
Damallsvenskan players
Expatriate women's footballers in Sweden
Glodis Perla Viggosdottir
Glodis Perla Viggosdottir
Women's association football defenders
FC Rosengård players
FC Bayern Munich (women) players
FIFA Century Club
UEFA Women's Euro 2022 players
UEFA Women's Euro 2017 players
Expatriate sportspeople in Germany